"Beautiful Mess" is a song performed by Bulgarian-Russian singer Kristian Kostov. The song was released as a digital download on 13 March 2017 through Virginia Records. The song represented Bulgaria in the Eurovision Song Contest 2017 in Kyiv, Ukraine.
Beautiful Mess was performed as Kostov's first song on Singer 2019.

Eurovision Song Contest

On 22 December 2016, the Bulgarian broadcaster Bulgarian National Television (BNT), made an open call for music producers and record labels to submit songs to become the Bulgarian entry in the Eurovision Song Contest 2017. On 25 January 2017, it was revealed that six songs had been shortlisted, and on 7 February, it was announced that three of the songs had been further shortlisted. On 13 March, Kostov was revealed as the Bulgarian entrant, while his song, "Beautiful Mess", was revealed later that same day. Bulgaria competed in the second half of the second semi-final at the Eurovision Song Contest.

It qualified from the second semi-final and went on to place second in the grand final, held on 13 May 2017. It is the best-performing song in Bulgaria's history at the Eurovision Song Contest.

Track listing

Charts

Release history

References

Eurovision songs of Bulgaria
Eurovision songs of 2017
2016 songs
2017 singles
Songs written by Joacim Persson
Songs written by Borislav Milanov